The JCC Maccabi Youth Games is an Olympic style event held annually for Jewish youth between the ages of 13 and 16. The games were first held in 1982 in Memphis, Tennessee, with sponsorship by the Memphis Jewish Community Center. More than 120,000 athletes have participated worldwide. The 2009 event was held in San Francisco, San Antonio and Westchester County simultaneously. The Maccabi Games' aim is to foster Jewish identity while developing national interest in Olympic sport through the Jewish Community Center's affiliation with the United States Olympic Committee. The 2011 games took place in Springfield (Massachusetts), Israel and Philadelphia. The 2012 JCC Maccabi Games were held in Houston, Rockland (New York]) and Memphis. 2013 host sites included Orange County (California) and Austin.

The following sports are contested each year.
Baseball
In-line hockey
Volleyball
Soccer
Basketball
Swimming
Tennis
Table tennis
Dance
Golf
Track & field
Lacrosse

References

Youth
Recurring sporting events established in 1982